The 1926 Idaho gubernatorial election was held on November 2, 1926. Republican nominee H. C. Baldridge defeated Progressive nominee W. Scott Hall with 51.05% of the vote.

General election

Candidates
Major party candidates
H. C. Baldridge, Republican 
Asher B. Wilson, Democratic

Other candidates
W. Scott Hall, Progressive

Results

References

1926
Idaho
Gubernatorial
November 1926 events